Uttara East Thana is a Thana of Bangladesh situated in Sector 4 of Uttara, Dhaka (Eastern side of Dhaka-Mymensingh Highway).

Uttara East was established on 31 May 1997. Its former name was Uttara Thana. The name was changed after new thana established named Uttara West Thana in western side of the town of Uttara.

This thana is formed by Sector 1, 2, 4, 6 and 8 of the town.

See also
 List of districts and suburbs of Dhaka

References

External links 
 Dhaka Metropolitan Police - Find Your Local Police
 Bangladesh Police - Metropolitan Police

Thanas of Uttara
1997 establishments in Bangladesh